Atlanta (formerly Xenia) is a city in Logan County, Illinois, United States. The population was 1,692 at the 2010 census.

History
The community was incorporated on March 26, 1853.

Geography

Demographics

2000 census

As of the census of 2000, there were 1,649 people, 694 households, and 469 families residing in the city. The racial makeup of the city was 99.58% White, 0.12% Native American, 0.12% from other races, and 0.18% from two or more races. Hispanic or Latino of any race were 0.42% of the population.

There were 694 households, out of which 30.7% had children under the age of 18 living with them, 56.6% were married couples living together, 8.5% had a female householder with no husband present, and 32.4% were non-families. 29.3% of all households were made up of individuals, and 15.3% had someone living alone who was 65 years of age or older. The average household size was 2.38 and the average family size was 2.93.

In the city, the population was spread out, with 24.0% under the age of 18, 9.2% from 18 to 24, 28.6% from 25 to 44, 23.5% from 45 to 64, and 14.8% who were 65 years of age or older. The median age was 38 years. For every 100 females, there were 90.6 males. For every 100 females age 18 and over, there were 86.9 males.

The median income for a household in the city was $43,194, and the median income for a family was $51,157. Males had a median income of $32,891 versus $25,658 for females. The per capita income for the city was $20,460. About 3.5% of families and 4.4% of the population were below the poverty line, including 2.6% of those under age 18 and 7.0% of those age 65 or over.

2010 census
Per the 2010 United States Census, Atlanta has 1,692 people.  Among non-Hispanics this includes 1,638 White (96.8%), 5 Black (0.3%), 6 Asian (0.4%), 2 Native American & 15 from two or more races.  The Hispanic or Latino population included 26 people (1.5%).

There were 718 households, out of which 30.4% had children under the age of 18 living with them, 53.2% were married couples living together, 6.5% had a female householder with children & no husband present, and 32.9% were non-families. 27.9% of all households were made up of individuals, and 24.7% had someone who was 65 years of age or older. The average household size was 2.35 and the average family size was 2.84.

The median age was 39.3 years. The gender ratio was 48.3% male & 51.7% female.  Among 718 occupied households, 79.4% were owner-occupied & 20.6% were renter-occupied.

Education
Atlanta Public Schools are part of the Olympia Community Unit School District 16. Students attend Olympia High School.

Notable people

Ellen Rankin Copp, sculptor, born in Atlanta
Lee Dunham,  first baseman in Major League Baseball, played for the Philadelphia Phillies; born in Atlanta
Dave Kindred, sportswriter
Eleanor Sophia Smith, composer, music educator, Hull House Music School co-founder

References

External links
History of Atlanta, Il.
Atlanta, Illinois Website

Cities in Illinois
Cities in Logan County, Illinois
1853 establishments in Illinois